Uddevalla (old ) is a town and the seat of Uddevalla Municipality in Västra Götaland County, Sweden. In 2015, it had a population of 34 781.

It is located at a bay of the south-eastern part of Skagerrak. The beaches of Uddevalla are filled with seashells and Uddevalla has one of the largest shell-banks in the world.

Uddevalla has a port and it once had a large shipyard, the Uddevallavarvet ("Uddevalla wharf"), which was the largest employer in Bohuslän during the 1960s. The 1970s recession, that affected the Swedish shipyard industry severely, led to the closing of the wharf in 1985.

History 

Uddevalla received its town privileges in 1498, but thought to have been a place of trade long before that. Formerly, Uddevalla belonged to Norway, and its name today comes from the original Norwegian Oddevald, which later turned into Oddevold. Due to its close location to Sweden and Denmark, it was often besieged. In 1612, it was burnt down by Swedish troops led by Jesper Mattson Krus and in 1644, it was once again burnt down, this time by Swedish commander Harald Stake. In 1658, it was ceded to Sweden at the treaty of Roskilde. The Norwegians recaptured the town a year later, and in 1660, it was once again ceded to Sweden at the peace treaty of Copenhagen. Later, Norway annexed Uddevalla and the nearby fortress on the Galleberg repeatedly, the last time in 1788.

In the 18th and 19th century, Uddevalla's main source of income was herring fishing. The town was also noted for the great fires that damaged the city on several occasions. The most devastating fire was in 1806, when the whole town burned to the ground. Only four houses were left untouched and 4,000 people became homeless.

During the 19th century, Uddevalla had trouble getting out of its own recession; poverty and alcoholism were widespread among the population. The reasons were mainly the aftermath of the fire in 1806, the decrease in herring fishing and the opening of the Trollhätte Canal.

In 1870–80, Uddevalla began to attract new industries. Much of that development can be attributed to the Scottish businessman William Thorburn, who is said to have been amazed by the town's beauty and therefore settled down in Uddevalla with his wife Jessy Macfie in 1822. He founded a number of industries, starting mostly with textile companies. The building of a new railroad, the Bohus Line, also contributed to the town's recovering economy. A prominent person in Uddevalla's history was Ture Malmgren, newspaper publisher and progressive liberal politician.

During the 1958 FIFA World Cup, Uddevalla was one of twelve Swedish towns to host matches, which were played at the Rimnersvallen stadium.

21st century 
After the Swedish shipyard crisis during the 1980s, resulting in the closing of the Uddevallavarvet, Uddevalla suffered an economic setback. Over the thirty years following that, the town has recovered and the population is once again increasing, slowly but steadily.

Education 
All the high schools in Uddevalla are administered as one school, the Uddevalla Gymnasieskola ("Uddevalla High School"), which is now the largest high school in Sweden. The school has 4,000 students attending the following branches of the high school:
 Agneberg – Social studies
 Sinclair (High school) – The arts and Media studies
 Östrabo 1 – Science studies
 Östrabo Y – Heavy industry schooling
 Margretegärde – Social studies and Science studies

There are also many primary schools in Uddevalla, some of them are:
 Äsperödskolan
 Västerskolan
 Fridaskolan
 Ramnerödsskolan
 Norgårdenskolan
 Norrskolan
 Sommarhemsskolan

Sports

Arenas 
Agnebergshallen is an indoor sports arena for various sports including handball.

The home ground for the IK Oddevold is the outdoor arena Rimnersvallen. A large indoor arena, the Rimnershallen, is next to the Rimnersvallen. It is used for handball and floorball as well as other sports.

Sports clubs 
The following sports clubs are located in Uddevalla:

Football 
 IK Oddevold
 IFK Uddevalla
 IFK Lane
 Herrestad AIF
 IK Rössö
IK Svane
 Rosseröds IK

Hockey 
 Uddevalla HC

Handball 
 GF Kroppskultur(GFK)
 Uddevalla HK(UHK)

Floorball 
 Walkesborg 99
 Herrestad AIF

Futsal 
 IFK Uddevalla Futsal Swedish Championship gold season 2016/2017.
 IK Oddevold Futsal

Twin towns – sister cities

Uddevalla is twinned with:

 Jõhvi, Estonia
 Loimaa, Finland
 Mosfellsbær, Iceland
 North Ayrshire, Scotland, United Kingdom
 Okazaki, Japan
 Skien, Norway
 Thisted, Denmark

See also 
 Fjällhyddan
 Tureborg Castle
 Ture Valleys
 Jeanna Oterdahl
 Eastern Cemetery
 Uddevalla Suffrage Association

References 

Bibliography
 
 Nationalencyklopedin

External links 

 Article Uddevalla, from NF
 Uddevalla Gymnasieskola Official site for Uddevalla Gymnasieskola
 Official website of Uddevalla

 
Populated places in Västra Götaland County
Populated places in Uddevalla Municipality
Municipal seats of Västra Götaland County
Swedish municipal seats
Coastal cities and towns in Sweden
Former Norwegian towns
Cities in Västra Götaland County